Na is a letter of related and vertically oriented alphabets used to write Mongolic and Tungusic languages.

Mongolian language 

Transliterated into Cyrillic with the letter .
 Distinction from other tooth-shaped letters by position in syllable sequence.
 Dotted before a vowel (attached or separated); undotted before a consonant (syllable-final) or a whitespace. Final dotted  is also found in modern Mongolian words.
 Derived from Old Uyghur nun.
 Produced with  using the Windows Mongolian keyboard layout.
 In the Mongolian Unicode block,  comes after  and before .

Notes

References 

Articles containing Mongolian script text
Mongolic letters
Mongolic languages
Tungusic languages